Udo August Ernst von Alvensleben (23 January 1897 – 22 August 1962) was a German art historian.

Family 
Born in Wittenmoor, Alvensleben descended from the old noble House of Alvensleben of the Margraviate of Brandenburg and was the eldest son of the landowner, Prussian chamberlain, member of the Prussian House of Lords and district deputy  (1852-1923), laird of Wittenmoor, Sichau-Tarnefitz and Plutowo, and of Ida von Alvensleben, née von Glasenapp (1866–1924). His youngest brother was the officer Wichard von Alvensleben (1902-1982), who became known through the liberation of prominent SS hostages in late April 1945. His middle brother Ludolf Jakob von Alvensleben was a SS and police leader in Italy.

In 1944, Alvensleben married baroness Elma zu Innhausen und Knyphausen (1919-2004) of Bodelschwingh Castle at Dortmund. This marriage produced three children, including the ambassador Busso von Alvensleben (b. 1949).

Education 
In 1914, Alvensleben graduated from the Ritterakademie (knight's academy) of St. Peter and Paul Cathedral in Brandenburg. From the First World War, during which he was mainly deployed in Northern France and Flanders, he returned as a first lieutenant. From 1919, he studied agriculture and forestry, history, art history and philosophy in Munich. Besides he took drawing, etching and lithography lessons.

In 1920, Alvensleben took over the management of the Wittenmoor estate and continued his studies in Berlin, which he expanded to include law, economics, diplomacy and archaeology. Diary entries show the man who was influenced by war experiences as an intellectual and spiritual seeker; in 1926 he visited Romain Rolland in Villeneuve on Lake Geneva. In 1926, he went to Hamburg and in 1927 he received his doctorate under the art historian Erwin Panofsky as Dr. phil. His dissertation on the Great Garden of the Herrenhausen Gardens of Hanover was published by Deutscher Kunstverlag and provided the inspiration for its reconstruction from 1936, in which he participated in an advisory capacity.

This was followed by travels in Europe, especially repeatedly to France, which influenced him throughout his life in his preference for the Baroque, and world travels, which took him to America and Asia. In 1927–28, he travelled to India together with his cousin, the Indologist Helmuth von Glasenapp. During his stays in China and Japan in 1932–33, he was mainly interested in their philosophy and in the art of the Chinese garden and Japanese garden. Among his friends was Hans-Hasso von Veltheim-Ostrau, who endeavoured to bring Indian teachings to Germany.

Other activities 

Like many of his ancestors, Alvensleben based his broad education on the idea that he would be involved in civil service. When the National Socialists came to power, he was forced to turn his attention to more private projects. Through his studies of palaces and gardens of the Baroque era, he became increasingly interested in his family's historical and cultural heritage. He also reconstructed the baroque park of the former Alvensleben  on behalf of the owners. In 1937, he published a book about the architect of Hundisburg, Hermann Korb, and his Brunswick castle buildings.

Extensive collections of written and photographic material were created. On Alvensleben's commission and on the basis of his preliminary work, the Dutch painter Anco Wigboldus drew all of the Alvensleben family's houses in the baroque style of bird's-eye view, after having visited them in his company and ascertained their condition in past centuries under his guidance. Park and manor at Wittenmoor experienced a heyday in its development with numerous guests, lively spiritual exchange and a lot of music. In 1936, Alvensleben had to give up part of its forest areas for the construction of the military training field  and in 1937 acquired the Keez estate (part of Brüel) near Schwerin in Mecklenburg, which offered him an additional challenge both economically and in terms of design.

During the Second World War, Alvensleben was a soldier in Poland, France, Russia, the Balkans, Italy and finally Norway. His diary during the war (excerpts published in 1971 under the title "Lauter Abschiede") reports on this. Together with the then Superintendent of Stendal Hermann Alberts, he saved the valuable medieval stained glass windows of the Stendal Cathedral by having them stored in his Wittenmoor manor house during the war.

After the expropriation of his property by the so-called land reform in the Soviet occupation zone of Germany in 1945, Alvensleben lived as a refugee in his wife's parents' house, Haus Bodelschwingh near Dortmund. He kept himself and his family afloat with lectures on cultural history and commissioned publications.

Alvensleben belonged to committees of the forestry industry, the Swedish-German Refugee Aid and the Central German Cultural Council, organised conferences, advised on questions of the restoration of historical gardens and continued his intensive research work. His publications from this period include "Die Lütetsburger Chronik", the history of the Frisian chief family Knyphausen, and "Alvenslebensche Burgen und Landsitze" (Castles and landed estates of the Alvenslebens). He made a major contribution to the fact that the von Alvensleben family resumed their family reunions, which had begun in 1479, after the expulsion in 1945, the rescued parts of the Alvensleben fiefdom library from the 16th century were secured in their holdings and the legendary medieval family ring was given a place of safekeeping commensurate with its importance. After reunification, the ring was entrusted to the cathedral treasure in Halberstadt, the episcopal town closely associated with the family's origins.

These are fascinating cultural-historical testimonies of strong personal expression and judgement.

Publications 
 Herrenhausen, Die Sommerresidenz der Welfen, Berlin 1929
 Die Braunschweigischen Schlösser der Barockzeit und ihr Baumeister Hermann Korb, Berlin 1937
 Die Lütetsburger Chronik, Geschichte eines friesischen Häuptlingsgeschlechts, Dortmund 1955
 Alvenslebensche Burgen und Landsitze, Dortmund 1960
 Lebenserinnerungen, unveröffentlichtes Manuskript
 Besuche vor dem Untergang, Adelssitze zwischen Altmark und Masuren, Aus Tagebuchaufzeichnungen von Udo von Alvensleben, Zusammengestellt und herausgegeben von Harald von Koenigswald, Frankfurt-Berlin 1968. Neuauflage: Als es sie noch gab…Adelssitze zwischen Altmark und Masuren. Ullstein, Berlin 1996, 
 Mauern im Strom der Zeit, Schlösser und Schicksale in Niederdeutschland, Aus Tagebuchaufzeichnungen von Udo von Alvensleben, Zusammengestellt und herausgegeben von Harald von Koenigswald, Frankfurt-Berlin 1969
 Schlösser und Schicksale, Herrensitze und Burgen zwischen Donau und Rhein, Aus Tagebuchaufzeichnungen von Udo von Alvensleben, Zusammengestellt und herausgegeben von Harald von Koenigswald, Frankfurt-Berlin 1970
 Lauter Abschiede, Tagebuch im Kriege, Herausgegeben von Harald von Koenigswald, Propyläen Verlag, Berlin 1971,

Further reading 
 Reimar von Alvensleben: Dr. Udo von Alvensleben-Wittenmoor (1897–1962) In Die Alvensleben in Kalbe 1324–1945 by Udo von Alvensleben-Wittenmoor, edited by Reimar von Alvensleben, Falkenberg 2010,  (with Porträtfoto, Schriftenverzeichnis und Literaturhinweisen)
 Harald Blanke (ed.): Ein brüderliches Alliance-Oeuvre, Beiträge zur Gartenkunst, Geschichte, und Denkmalpflege im Werk von Udo von Alvensleben und Anco Wigboldus, Hundisburg 2004
 : Udo A.E. von Alvensleben-Wittenmoor – Landedelmann und Kunsthistoriker (in Aus der Altmark, Jahresbericht des Altmärkischen Vereins für Vaterländische Geschichte, 65, Berlin 1984)
 : Alvenslebensche Schlösserbilder (In Freies Spiel des Geistes. Reden und Essais, Düsseldorf-Köln 1961)
 Martin Wiehle: Altmark-Persönlichkeiten. Biographisches Lexikon der Altmark, des Elbe-Havel-Landes und des Jerichower Landes (Beiträge zur Kulturgeschichte der Altmark und ihrer Randgebiete. Vol. 5). Dr. ziethen verlag, Oschersleben 1999, .
 Anco Wigboldus: Burgen, Schlösser und Gärten, Braubach 1974

References

External links 
 

Udo
German art historians
1897 births
1962 deaths
People from Saxony-Anhalt
German military personnel of World War II